Title 37 of the United States Code outlines the role of Pay and Allowances of the Uniformed Services in the United States Code.

Contents 
 —Definitions
 —Basic Pay
 —Special and Incentive Pays
 —Allowances Other Than Travel and Transportation Allowances
 —Travel and Transportation Allowances
 —Leave
 —Payments to Missing Persons
 —Payments to Mentally Incompetent Persons
 —Allotments and Assignments of Pay
 —Prohibitions and Penalties
 —Miscellaneous Rights and Benefits
 —Administration

External links
U.S. Code Title 37, via United States Government Printing Office
U.S. Code Title 37, via Cornell University

37
Title 37
United States military pay and benefits